The Inner Cinema is the second album by Soma, released in 1996 through Extreme Records.

Track listing

Personnel 
Soma
Pieter Bourke – instruments
David Thrussell – instruments
Production and additional personnel
Leigh Ashforth – cover art
Soma – mastering, cover art
François Tétaz – mastering

References

External links 
 

1996 albums
Extreme Records albums
Soma (band) albums